Jeonnam Yeonggwang Football Club, also known as Chunnam Youngkwang FC, is a South Korean football club based in Yeonggwang, South Jeolla. From 2010 season, Jeonnam Yeonggwang FC plays in the Challengers League, the third tier of Korean football. Yeonggwang FC's home stadium is Yeonggwang Sportium.

Squad

Managers
 Jung Pyung-Yeol (2010-?)
 Kim Han-bong (?-2015)
 Tae-Yeop Lee (2016)

Honours

Season by season records

References

K3 League (2007–2019) clubs
Sport in South Jeolla Province
Yeonggwang County
Association football clubs established in 2010
2010 establishments in South Korea